Arcot Road (also known as N. S. Krishnan Salai) (SH-113) is one of the main arterial roads of the city of Chennai in Tamil Nadu, India. It runs for 12 kilometres and connects Nungambakkam with Porur. The road was constructed during the early 1940s and has been responsible for the development of the outlying areas on the western fringes of Chennai city.

Alignment 
A span of 6 kilometres of the Arcot Road is located within the Chennai district and the remaining 6 kilometres are located in the Poonamallee taluk of Thiruvallur district.

The Chennai Metro Rail Limited, along with the Highways Department planned to build a 400-metre long flyover along Inner Ring Road, Chennai at the junction of Arcot Road in Vadapalani on either side of the metro viaduct.

The Highways Department is building another flyover at the junction of Arcot Road with Mount-Poonamallee Road near Porur.

Neighbourhoods traversed by Arcot Road 
 Nungambakkam
 Kodambakkam
 Vadapalani
 Saligrammam
 Virugambakkam
 Alwarthirunagar
 Valasarawakkam
 Porur
Alapakkam

See also

 Transport in Chennai

References 

 
 

Roads in Chennai